The Queensland Pacing Championship is the most important event in Queensland harness racing. It is usually the opening leg of the Australasian Pacers Grand Circuit. The race was previously known as the Albion Park Ten Thousand between 1969 and 1974 and then as the Sir Clive Uhr Championship from 1975 to 1980. In 2006 the race was postponed from Saturday to Tuesday due to rain and it was not run in 2007 due to the Equine Influenza outbreak that occurred in Queensland and New South Wales. In April 2016 Racing Queensland announced that the Queensland Pacing Championship would be discontinued due to financial considerations.

Winners list

See also

 A G Hunter Cup
 Australian Pacing Championship
 Inter Dominion Pacing Championship
 Miracle Mile Pace
 New Zealand Trotting Cup
 Harness racing in Australia
 Harness racing in New Zealand

References

Harness races in Australia